The Sankt Florian Psalter or Saint Florian Psalter ( or ,  or ,  or ) is a brightly illuminated trilingual manuscript psalter, written between late 14th and early 15th centuries in Latin, Polish and German. The Polish text is the oldest known translation of the Book of Psalms into that language. Its author, first owners, and place of origin are still not certain. It was named after St. Florian Monastery in Sankt Florian, a town in Austria, where it was discovered.

Origins and history
It is not known exactly who was original owner of the book. Most likely it belonged to a female member of the House of Anjou (wife or daughter of Louis I of Hungary), or it was made for Jadwiga of Poland. Its creator is also unknown, and even its place of origin is uncertain, with scholars seeing either Bohemia (Kłodzko) or Lesser Poland (Kraków) (or both) as the likely regions of origin. The text contains several examples of central Lesser Polish dialect, and some scholars suggested that the work might have been carried out or at least influenced by bishop Piotr Wysz.

Polish historian of literature, Julian Krzyżanowski, suggested that the text is a copy of an older work, perhaps the St. Kinga's Psalter (whose very existence is still disputed by scholars) though admitted that there's scant evidence for this.

It was rediscovered by local librarian, Father Josef Chmel, in 1827 in St. Florian Monastery, in the town of Sankt Florian near Linz, Austria. It first published in print in Vienna in 1834, by Polish publisher Stanislaw Jan Borkowski. In 1931 the psalter was purchased by Polish government for the National Library of Poland. During World War II it was evacuated to Romania and later to France and Canada, and returned to Poland in 1959.
By 1939, whole book was published in Lwow by Ludwik Biernacki.

Currently, the book is kept at the National Library of Poland in Warsaw.

Composition
The manuscript contains a trilingual translation of the Psalms into Latin, Polish and German, as well as two prologues by Ludolph of Saxony, the Athanasian Creed, and musical score for several canticles. It is richly illustrated with astrological and Christian symbology.

The text is divided into three parts:
part one, psalms 1–101,
part two, psalms 102–106,
part three, psalms 107–150.

Each part was created at a different place in time. The first part was probably written in late 14th century, while second and third were written in the 15th century. One date given for the year that the work on the  Psalter begun is 1398; another – 1370s. In these parts, influences of the Czech language are visible, as probably the psalter was patterned after a similar Czech publication.

The book has a format of 34,5 × 24,5 cm and a weight of about 4 kilograms. The material used was parchment.

Significance
It is the oldest surviving translation of the Books of Psalms into the Polish language. The translation from Latin into Polish, however, is considered very poor. The psalter is also the oldest Polish language cultural artifact (zabytek) surviving to modern day in intact form.

See also
Bible translations into Polish
Millennium Bible
Bible translations into Slavic languages

Notes

References

Sources

External links
 Full scan of the Sankt Florian Psalter at Polona
 Transcription of the Polish translation of selected psalms from the Sankt Floran Psalter by Wacław Twardzik, at Staropolska

Polish literature
Polish
History of Christianity in Poland
14th-century books
14th century in Poland